The Rubinstein Memorial is an annual chess tournament held in Polanica-Zdrój, Poland in honour of the chess legend Akiba Rubinstein. Rubinstein died in 1961 and the tournament had its first edition in 1963. The tournament usually consists of several tournaments in different rating or age groups. The main tournament is usually a closed round-robin tournament, while the other tournaments are open Swiss system tournaments.

Winners
{| class="sortable wikitable"
! # !! Year !! Winner !! #RR
|-
| 1||1963|| || 16
|-
| 2||1964||   || 16 
|-
| 3||1965||  || 14 
|-
| 4||1966|| || 15 
|-
| 5||1967|| || 16
|-
| 6||1968|| || 16
|-
| 7||1969|| || 16 
|-
| 8||1970|| || 16
|-
| 9||1971|| || 16
|-
| 10||1972|| || 16
|-
| 11||1973|| || 14
|-
| 12||1974|| || 16
|-
| 13||1975||  || 16
|-
| 14||1976||  || 15
|-
| 15||1977|| || 18
|-
| 16||1978|| || 15
|-
| 17||1979|| || 16
|-
| 18||1980|| || 14
|-
| 19||1981|| || 14
|-
| 20||1982|| || 15
|-
| 21||1983|| || 15
|-
| 22||1984|| || 16
|-
| 23||1985|| || 16
|-
| 24||1986|| || 13
|-
| 25||1987|| || 13
|-
| 26||1988|| || 15
|-
| 27||1989|| || 16
|-
| 28||1991|| || 12
|-
| 29||1992|| || 12
|-
| 30||1993|| || 12
|-
| 31||1994|| || Open
|-
| 32||1995|| || 12
|-
| 33||1996|| || 12
|-
| 34||1997|| || 10
|-
| 35||1998|| || 10
|-
| 36||1999|| || 10
|-
| 37||2000|| || 10
|-
| 38||2001|| || Open 
|-
| 39||2002|| || Open
|-
| 40||2003|| || Open
|-
| 41||2005|| || Open
|-
| 42||2006|| || 10
|-
| 43||2007|| || 10
|-
| 44||2008|| || 10
|-
| 45||2009|| || Open
|-
| 46||2010|| || Open
|-
| 47||2011|| || 10
|-
| 49||2013|| || 10
|-
| 50||2014|| || 10
|-
| 51||2015|| || 10
|-
| 52||2016|| || Open
|-
| 53||2017|| || Open
|-
| 54||2018|| || Open
|}

External links
Rubinstein Memorial, homepage
Complete results, games and crosstables 1963-2001

Chess competitions
Chess in Poland
1963 in chess
Recurring sporting events established in 1963
Chess memorial tournaments
Kłodzko County
1963 establishments in Poland